Vince Collins is an American film director and animator. He is best known for directing the 1982 animation short film Malice in Wonderland, as well as other experimental animated short films and psychedelic animations.

Animation career
Collins' work began getting noticed with his style of hand-drawn animation. As times changed, he started creating 3D animations. In 1975, the short film Euphoria won him a student academy award. Malice in Wonderland is one of Collins's most popular works that's based on Lewis Caroll's Alice in Wonderland. The short film has been described as hallucinogenic. Collins did not find success in Hollywood.

Recognition
Malice in Wonderland by Collins was considered to be showcased at the 25th Animafest Zagreb event held in 2015.

Filmography

 Gilgamish (1973)
 Euphoria (1974)
 200 (1975)
 Fantasy (1976)
 Animation (1979)
 Malice in Wonderland (1982)
 Life is flashing before your eyes (1984)
 General Chaos: Uncensored Animation (1998)
 Instant  Clown Party (2013)
 Animation School Dropout (2014)
 Subliminal Mind Circus (2018)

References

External links

American animated film directors
American experimental filmmakers
Year of birth missing (living people)
Living people
San Francisco Art Institute alumni